= Hermann Rülander =

German footballer (born 1960)

Personal information
- Date of birth: 21 November 1960 (age 65)
- Height: 1.82 m (6 ft 0 in)
- Position: Goalkeeper

Senior career*
Years	Team	Apps	(Gls)
1978–1981	Werder Bremen II		
1981	Werder Bremen	2	(0)
1986–1992	Meppen	97	(0)
Total		99	(0)
- * Club domestic league appearances and goals

Hermann Rülander (born 21 November 1960) is a German former professional footballer who played as a goalkeeper.

== Career ==
Rülander began his career with Werder Bremen, and is known for having a disastrous debut on 7 November 1981, conceding seven goals (including an own goal) before being substituted in an eventual 9–2 defeat. He made one further appearance for the club, before being released.

He later played for Meppen, for whom he made 100 appearances in all competitions.
